Swedish bandy champions is a title held by the winners of the final of the highest Swedish bandy league played each year, Elitserien.

The final is called Svenska bandyfinalen ("Swedish Bandy Final") and is played in March. From the 2007–08 season, Saturday replaced Sunday as the final date, but was changed back to Sunday again and again to Saturday in 2015 in 2010. In 2009 Eurosport 2 showed it for the 1st time.

History
The first final was held in 1907, when IFK Uppsala beat IFK Gävle with 4–1 in Boulognerskogen, Gävle.

In 1912 two winners were declared, because no replay of the tied final could be played due to the weather.

Venue
The arena with the most finals is Stockholm Olympic Stadium in Stockholm (50 times), Söderstadion in Stockholm (23) and Studenternas IP (17). Other venues are Rocklunda IP in Västerås, Idrottsparken in Norrköping, the bay of Brunnsviken in Stockholm, Tunavallen in Eskilstuna, Strömvallen in Gävle and Tingvalla IP in Karlstad.

Until the mid-20th Century, bandy was often played on naturally frozen lakes. The final was played on lakes eight times, 1907, 1910, 1912, 1914, 1915, 1934 (the replay), 1943 (the replay), and 1949.

From 1991 to 2012, all men's finals have been held on Studenternas IP in Uppsala. The final weekend starts with finals for youth's, junior's and women's team on Saturday and the men's final on Sunday. From 2013 the new venue is Friends Arena. In 2013 and 2014 the final was played at Friends Arena in Solna and from 2015 it is played at Tele2 Arena in Stockholm.

The attendance record of the finals is from mars 16, 2013, when 38,474 people saw Hammarby IF against Sandvikens AIK on Friends Arena.

Winners throughout the years

Men

Notes

Women

Title champions

Men's titles per club

Women's titles per club

Men's titles per town

Notes
 AIK moved from Stockholm to Solna in the 1930s, but all titles were taken before the move.

Women's titles per town

Men's and women's titles the same year

References

External links
Images from the Swedish national bandy championship finals at på Studenternas IP i Uppsala
Swedish bandy national championship finals at SVT's open archive 
Svenska Bandyförbundet - Herrfinaler
Svenska Bandyförbundet - Damfinaler

Champions
Elitserien (bandy) lists
Sweden